North Central West Virginia Airport  is a public/military airport a mile northeast of Bridgeport and six miles east of Clarksburg, in Harrison County, West Virginia. It is owned and operated by the Benedum Airport Authority, serving Harrison and Marion County, and was formerly Benedum Airport and Harrison-Marion Regional Airport. The airport sees two airlines, with some passenger service subsidized by the Essential Air Service program.

Federal Aviation Administration records say the airport had 36,917 passenger boardings (enplanements) in calendar year 2018, 25,105 in 2017 and 10,694 in 2010. The National Plan of Integrated Airport Systems for 2011–2015 categorized it as a primary commercial service airport (more than 10,000 enplanements per year).

History
The airport opened in 1935 as the Tri-County Airport, a joint effort of Harrison, Marion and Taylor County. It was a grass airstrip on leased land. In 1937, Marion and Taylor County withdrew from the project; in 1938, Harrison County purchased land to expand the airport. In 1944, the airport was renamed Benedum Airport after Michael L. Benedum.

In the 1950s, the airport had 3719-foot runway 5 and 2978-foot runway 16; around 1964, both were replaced by 5200-ft runway 3 and 2500-ft runway 13. The first airline flights were Capital DC-3s in 1949; Lake Central replaced Capital at the end of 1960, and successor Allegheny's last Convair left about the end of 1977.

The current airport authority was established in 1960. Enplanements for 2018 were 36,917 up from 25,105 the year before, a 47% increase.

In August 2019, West Virginia governor Jim Justice came to the airport to announce a $20 million investment to be made at the airport: a new terminal, taxiways, and more space for economic development. On June 25, 2021, officials broke ground on the site of the new terminal and 100-acre AeroTech business park with a planned completion of 2023.

In March 2022, Skywest announced the end of service at the North Central West Virginia Airport, along with 28 other cities, due to a pilot shortage. The company stated the service would end within the next 90 days of the announcement. Days after the announcement, the Department of Transportation announced a hold on the termination of service until a replacement can be found, per Essential Air Service rules.

On July 7th, 2022, the airport authority announced Contour Airlines as the successor to Skywest. Non-stop flights to Charlotte began on December 1st, 2022.

Facilities
The airport covers 434 acres (176 ha) at an elevation of 1,224 feet (373 m). Its single runway, 3/21, is 7,800 by 150 feet (2,377 x 46 m) long. It has one helipad, 50 by 50 feet (15 x 15 m).

In the year ending October 31, 2011, the airport had 24,600 aircraft operations, average 67 per day: 54% military, 35% general aviation, 10% air taxi, and <1% airline. 80 aircraft were then based at this airport: 61% single-engine, 20% multi-engine, 4% jet, and 15% military.

The airport is home to the Mid-Atlantic Aerospace Complex which hosts many leading aerospace companies such as Aurora Flight Sciences, Pratt & Whitney, Mitsubishi Heavy Industries (formerly Bombardier), and Lockheed Martin.

Fairmont State University operates its flight school from a facility on the east side of the runway. The school operates Cessna 172's and one Piper PA-23.

Also located at the airport is the Army National Guard's Fixed Wing Army Aviation Training Site (FWAATS). The FWAATS trains Army aviators from all three components in the C-12 and C-26 aircraft.

Airlines and destinations

Statistics

Top destinations

References

Other sources

 Essential Air Service documents (Docket DOT-OST-2005-20736) from the U.S. Department of Transportation:
 Notice (March 22, 2005): of Air Midwest, Inc. of its intent to discontinue scheduled non-subsidized Essential Air Service between Clarksburg/Fairmont, West Virginia and Pittsburgh, Pennsylvania, effective June 20, 2005.
 Order 2005-4-19 (April 19, 2005): prohibiting Air Midwest, Inc., from terminating its unsubsidized, scheduled air service at Parkersburg, Morgantown and Clarksburg/Fairmont, West Virginia, beyond the end of its 90-day notice periods, and requesting proposals from carriers interested in providing replacement essential air service (EAS) at the communities, with or without subsidy.
 Order 2005-9-8 (September 9, 2005): selecting RegionsAir, Inc. to provide subsidized essential air Service (EAS) at Parkersburg, Morgantown and Clarksburg/Fairmont, West Virginia for a two-year period and establishing a combined subsidy rate of $1,051,333 per year for service consisting of 18 nonstop round trips each week between Parkersburg and Cincinnati, and 18 round trips to Cincinnati each week over a MGW-CKB-CVG-CKB-MGW routing, with 34-seat Saab 340A aircraft.
 Order 2007-1-16 (January 25, 2007): selecting Colgan Air, Inc. d/b/a US Airways Express to provide subsidized essential air service (EAS) at Parkersburg, Morgantown, and Clarksburg/Fairmont, West Virginia, for two years, beginning when the carrier inaugurates service. Each community will receive 19 weekly round trips to Pittsburgh with 34-passenger Saab 340 aircraft. Service from Parkersburg will be nonstop in each direction. Service from Morgantown and Clarksburg/Fairmont will be served with a Pittsburgh - Morgantown - Clarksburg - Pittsburgh or a Pittsburgh - Clarksburg - Morgantown - Pittsburgh routing. The total combined annual subsidy is $2,421,914.
 Ninety-Day Notice (March 28, 2008): of intent of Colgan Air Inc. D/B/A United Express to terminate scheduled essential air service at Parkersburg, Morgantown and Clarksburg/Fairmont, WV, effective June 28, 2008.
 Order 2008-5-37 (May 27, 2008): re-selecting Colgan Air, Inc. d/b/a United Express, to provide subsidized essential air service (EAS) at Morgantown and Clarksburg/Fairmont, West Virginia, at a total annual subsidy rate of $2,116,650, for the two-year period of June 1, 2008, through May 31, 2010,
 Order 2010-6-25 (June 29, 2010): re-selecting Colgan Air, Inc. to provide essential air service (EAS) at Clarksburg/Fairmont and Morgantown, WV, for a combined annual subsidy of $2,976,438, and at Beckley, WV, for an annual subsidy of $2,313, 457, for the two-year period from August 1, 2010, through July 31, 2012. Also selecting Gulfstream International Airlines, Inc., to provide EAS at Parkersburg, WV/Marietta, OH, at an annual subsidy rate of $2,642,237, for a two-year period beginning when the carrier inaugurates full EAS through the end of the 24th month thereafter. The total annual subsidy for all four communities is $7,923,132.
 Order 2012-4-32 (April 30, 2012): selecting Silver Airways to provide Essential Air Service (EAS) at Beckley, Clarksburg/Fairmont ("Clarksburg") and Morgantown, West Virginia, for a combined annual subsidy of $5,968,744 ($2,512,494 for Beckley; $3,456,250 for Clarksburg and Morgantown), for the two-year period beginning when the carrier begins full EAS at all three communities.

External links
 North Central West Virginia Airport, official site
 Aerial image as of April 1997 from USGS The National Map
 
 
 

Airports in West Virginia
Clarksburg, West Virginia
Clarksburg micropolitan area
Essential Air Service
Buildings and structures in Harrison County, West Virginia
Transportation in Harrison County, West Virginia